John Bertolini (21 March 1934 – 21 June 2021) was a Scottish professional footballer who played as a wing half. He was later a manager.

Career
Born in Alloa, of Italian descent, Bertolini played for Alva Albion Rangers, Stirling Albion, Workington and Brighton & Hove Albion.

Signed by Albion manager Billy Lane, Bertolini played at right half and had a spell of 193 consecutive appearances during his career at the Goldstone. A knee-ligament injury while turning out for the reserves ended his career in October 1965.

After retiring, he managed Whitehawk ran a pub in Shoreham-by-Sea, West Sussex, and worked in the car and van hire business.

He suffered from dementia and spent the last eight years of his life in a care home in Worthing, where he died on 21 June 2021, aged 87.

References

1934 births
2021 deaths
People from Alloa
Sportspeople from Clackmannanshire
Scottish people of Italian descent
Scottish footballers
Association football wing halves
Alva Albion Rangers F.C. players
Stirling Albion F.C. players
Workington A.F.C. players
Brighton & Hove Albion F.C. players
Scottish Football League players
English Football League players
Scottish football managers
Whitehawk F.C. managers